The .350 Rigby and .350 Rigby No 2 are proprietary medium bore rifle cartridges developed by developed by John Rigby & Company.

Design
The .350 Rigby and .350 Rigby No 2 are both bottlenecked centerfire rifle cartridges, originally both cartridges fired a bullet of  weighing .

.350 Rigby

.350 Rigby No 2

History
John Rigby & Co introduced both cartridges in 1908, intended for use as an all-round African hunting rounds, they were somewhat overshadowed by the arrival of the .375 Holland & Holland in 1912, although some sportsmen preferred these cartridges to the latter as the Rigby cartridges had less recoil.

Use
The .350 Rigby and .350 Rigby No 2 have been used successfully as general purpose African hunting cartridges on most African game species.

Famous users included Denys Finch Hatton, Pete Pearson and  John "Pondoro" Taylor.  In his African Rifles and Cartridges Taylor wrote of the .350 Rigby "There is nothing spectacular about this cartridge; it has never had the write-up that the .318 and .375 Magnum get from time to time; nevertheless, it is a splendidly effective shell and at ranges of up to at least 150 yards kills as instantaneously as the .375 Magnum. In addition, it has an appreciably lighter recoil."

See also
Nitro Express
List of rifle cartridges
9mm rifle cartridges

References

External links
 Ammo-One, ".350 Rigby Magnum", ammo-one.com, retrieved 8 November 2017.
 Peter Carr, ".350 Magnum Rigby", sahunters.co.za, retrieved 6 August 2014.
 Cartridgecollector, ".350 Rigby Magnum", cartridgecollector.net, retrieved 8 November 2017.
 The Spanish Association of Cartridge Collectors, ".350 Rigby Magnum", municon.org, archived 1 January 2015.

Pistol and rifle cartridges
British firearm cartridges
John Rigby & Co cartridges
Weapons and ammunition introduced in 1908